
Gmina Bielany is a rural gmina (administrative district) in Sokołów County, Masovian Voivodeship, in east-central Poland.

Villages
Gmina Bielany contains the villages and settlements of Bielany, Bielany-Jarosławy, Bielany-Wąsy, Błonie Duże, Błonie Małe, Brodacze, Dmochy-Rętki, Dmochy-Rogale, Korabie, Kowiesy, Kożuchów, Kożuchówek, Księżopole-Budki, Księżopole-Komory, Kudelczyn, Paczuski Duże, Patrykozy, Patrykozy-Kolonia, Rozbity Kamień, Ruciany, Ruda-Kolonia, Sikory, Trebień, Wańtuchy, Wiechetki Duże, Wiechetki Małe, Wojewódki Dolne, Wojewódki Górne and Wyszomierz.

Neighbouring gminas
Gmina Bielany is bordered by the gminas of Liw, Mokobody, Paprotnia, Repki, Sokołów Podlaski and Suchożebry.

References

Polish official population figures 2006

Bielany
Sokołów County